Graciela Chichilnisky (born 1944) is an Argentine American mathematical economist.  She is a professor of economics at Columbia University and has expertise in climate change. She is also co-founder and former CEO of the company Global Thermostat.

Background and education
Chichilnisky was born in Buenos Aires, Argentina, the daughter of Russian Jewish immigrants.  After a military coup,  the Argentine military violently closed scientific faculties at the University of Buenos Aires on July 29, and she left Argentina for the United States, Supported by a fellowship from the Ford Foundation,. Chichilnisky matriculated in the doctoral program in mathematics at the Massachusetts Institute of Technology although without an undergraduate degree; she moved to the University of California, Berkeley in 1968, and completed her Ph.D. in mathematics there in 1970, under the supervision of Jerrold E. Marsden. She  earned a second Ph.D. in  economics in 1976 under the supervision of Gérard Debreu.

Career
After a postdoctoral position at Harvard University, she accepted a position as an associate professor at Columbia University in 1977, and received tenure there in 1979, and was named UNESCO Professor of Mathematics and Economics from 1995 to 2008. She also held a chair in economics at the University of Essex from 1980 to 1981, and  has additionally been a visiting professor at other universities including at Stanford in 2017.

In 2010 Chichilnisky, together with Peter Eisenberger and Edgar Bronfman Jr. formed Global Thermostat, a company that specializes in Direct air capture from a unit that extracts carbon dioxide directly from air.

Research

Chichilnisky is the author of over 17 books and over 330 scientific research papers. She is best known for proposing and designing the carbon credit emissions trading market underlying the Kyoto Protocol which was international law since 2005, and was a lead author on the 2007 Intergovernmental Panel on Climate Change that won the 2007 Nobel Prize.

In the theory of international trade, she constructed an example of a "transfer paradox", where a transfer of goods from a donor to a recipient can render the recipient worse off and the donor better off. She constructed examples where export-led growth strategies for developing countries could result in paradoxically poor results, because of increasing returns to scale in the technologies of the developed countries.

In welfare economics and voting theory, particularly in the specialty of social choice theory, Chichilnisky introduced a continuous model of collective decisions to which she applied algebraic topology; following her initiatives, continuous social choice has developed as an international subdiscipline. During the 1980s and 1990s some of Chichilnisky's research was done in collaboration with mathematical economist Geoffrey M. Heal, who has been her colleague at Essex and Columbia.

Litigation
In 1994 Chichilnisky sued two other economics professors, accusing them of stealing her ideas. Chichilnisky was countersued and dropped her lawsuit. The subject matter of the controversy was described in contemporaneous news reports as "distinctly small-time stuff, at least according to most experts."  In 1991 and 2000 Chichilnisky sued her employer Columbia University alleging gender discrimination, pay inequality, and attempts by the university to dissolve her endowed chair. The latter suit was settled in 2008 under undisclosed terms; The New York Sun reported that Chichilnisky received $200,000.  According to Columbia's spokesperson, "Chichilnisky signed a statement that her salary was not discriminatory".

Selected publications

Peer-reviewed articles

Book chapters 
 Beltratti, A., Chichilnisky, G. and Heal, G., 1998. Sustainable use of renewable resources. In Sustainability: Dynamics and Uncertainty (pp. 49–76). Springer Netherlands.

Books
 
 
 
 
 
 
 
 Oil and the International Economy (1991) 
 The Evolving International Economy (1987) 
 Sustainability, Dynamics and Uncertainty (1998) 
 Markets, Information and Uncertainty: Essays in Economic Theory in Honor of Kenneth J. Arrow (1999) 
 Catastrophe or new society?: A Latin American world model (1976) 
 Development and Global Finance: The Case for an International Bank for Environmental Settlements (1997) 
 Environmental Markets: Equity and Efficiency (2000) 
 The Economics of Climate Change (2010) 
 Reversing Climate Change (2020) 
 Handbook on the Economics of Climate Change (2018)

Awards and recognition
Dr. Graciela Chichilnisky was selected by IAIR (International Alternative Investment Review) as the 2015 CEO of the Year in Sustainability.

References

External links 
 
 Official website

Climate economists
Trade economists
Development economists
Mathematical economists
Voting theorists
Game theorists
Columbia University faculty
Topologists
American women economists
American women political scientists
American political scientists
UC Berkeley College of Letters and Science alumni
Academics of the University of Essex
Argentine economists
Argentine women economists
Argentine Jews
American people of Argentine-Jewish descent
American expatriates in England
American political philosophers
People from Buenos Aires
Argentine people of Russian-Jewish descent
Argentine emigrants to the United States
Living people
1946 births
21st-century American women